Conimitella is a genus of flowering plants belonging to the family Saxifragaceae.

Its native range is Western Central Canada to Northwestern USA

Species:
 Conimitella williamsii (D.C.Eaton) Rydb.

References

Saxifragaceae
Saxifragaceae genera